Reverse, Then Forward Again is a compilation of music from San Diegan punk band Dogwood, made up of songs from previous releases. The title is a reference to a very brief scene from a Tooth & Nail Records DVD compilation that features the band driving their rental van in a very erratic manner outside of the record label's office.

Track listing
 "Label Me"   	
 "Tiramisu" 	
 "All Hands On Deck" 	
 "Preschool Days" 	
 "Redefine Defiance" 	
 "Suffer" 	
 "Never Die" 	
 "My Best Year" 	
 "Control" 	
 "The Good Times" 	
 "Building A Better Me" 	
 "Comes Crashing" 	
 "Nothing New" 	
 "1983" 	
 "Nothing Is Everything" 	
 "Do Or Die" 	
 "Seismic" 	
 "Conscience In A Cave" 	
 "Absolution" 	
 "Last Of The Lost" 	
 "Flower Soon Die" 	
 "Sanctuary" 	
 "Undertaking" 	
 "Instigator"

Dogwood (band) compilation albums
2004 compilation albums
Tooth & Nail Records compilation albums